Juan Andrés Gómez Medina (born 9 February 1992) is a Chilean footballer who currently plays for the Chilean Primera División side O'Higgins as a centre back.

External links
Juan Gómez at Football Lineups

1992 births
Living people
Chilean footballers
Association football defenders
O'Higgins F.C. footballers
Chilean Primera División players
People from Rancagua